Grant Tiernan Amato (born May 20, 1989) is an American murderer who was convicted of a familicide that occurred on the evening of January 24, 2019. Amato shot his father, mother, and brother Cody in the head at their home in Seminole County, Florida, while attempting to stage it as a murder-suicide committed by his brother before fleeing the residence.

After a 24-hour manhunt, police took Amato into custody for questioning in Orange County, Florida, following his disappearance. They later arrested him on three charges of first-degree murder. During his trial, explicit photographs were found on his thumb drive connected to the killings, which were used as evidence. His lawyers defended him by saying investigators and analysts at the scene did not properly consider other suspects or process other evidence that could convict another person. The judge denied the hearing and did not let Amato out on a bond motion, and later instead sentenced him to life in prison without the possibility of parole.

Before the murders occurred, Amato had developed an infatuation with Bulgarian model and cam girl Silviya Ventsislavova (Bulgarian: Силвия Венциславова), who went by the alias "Silvie" online. Amato used some of his father's and brother's money that amounted to $200,000 to pay to attend her webcam sessions. He attempted therapy and treatment by going to a rehabilitation center. After a week of treatment, he returned home, where he argued with his father over continuing to contact Ventsislavova. This argument was later revealed to be the deciding motive for the murders a month later.

Background
Grant Amato was born on May 20, 1989, in Chuluota, Florida, to Chad and Margaret Ann Amato, the former a clinical pharmacist and the latter a senior operations manager. He was raised in Chuluota along with his brother Cody, with whom he was close. His elder, half-brother Jason lived elsewhere. He went to Timber Creek High School, along with Cody, and they both joined the weightlifting team together after getting interested in health. Both Cody and Grant attended the University of Central Florida, where they attended nursing school together and then proceeded to pursue further studies to become nurse anesthetists. Cody graduated from his anesthesiology program while Grant dropped out, though Grant was able to find work at the hospital AdventHealth Orlando as a nurse.

Grant was suspended from his job in June 2018 under suspicion of stealing and improperly administering medication to patients and for suicidal thoughts. Although officers denied the allegations that he was suicidal, saying he did not meet the criteria to be a danger to himself or others around him, they concluded there was evidence to the claim of improper medicine administration. Hospital staff had beforehand found eight empty vials of the sedative propofol in two rooms that Grant had been overseeing, which had not been ordered by any doctors. When confronted during his suspension, he said that he had "administered the drug to patients who were not being adequately relaxed". The hospital then fired him and police officers subsequently arrested him for grand larceny after the investigation concluded, but the charges were later dropped.

Silvie and arguments
Due to his inability to find work following the charges, he attempted to become a streamer on Twitch, mostly by playing video games and live streaming. After the family paid for equipment and streaming setup, Grant Amato only pretended to become a twitch streamer and never actually hosted any streams. While not live streaming, he would frequently visit pornographic websites, including the site MyFreeCams, and on there Amato met a cam model named Silviya Ventsislavova, who went by the alias "Silvie" online. He would pay tokens by the minute for her virtual company. He would spend up to four hours a night on the website, buying up to 5,000 tokens at a time costing over $600. Silvie's shows would cost 90 tokens a minute. Grant assumed a façade as a rich and successful gamer, sending her various lingerie and sex toys, as well as paying an exorbitant amount for her time. He would steal credit cards from his family, claiming they were for starting up his Twitch career. Within a few months, Grant had spent up to $200,000 of his family's money on Silvie.

His family sent Grant to a rehabilitation facility for porn and internet addiction, which cost them $15,000. He was allowed to return home after a couple of weeks but was given a zero-tolerance ultimatum, and Grant had to get a job and was prohibited from having any contact with Silvie. However, he was able to convince his mother to let him use her phone to make contact with the webcam model. Upon learning this, Chad ordered Grant to pack up his things and leave the house.

Murders 
On January 24, 2019, while his mother was on the computer, Grant shot her in the back of the head with an IWI Jericho 941 pistol. After, he waited for his father to arrive. Once he walked into the kitchen, Grant shot him twice. To convince Cody to come home after his nursing shift, he texted him using his father's number. Upon entering the door, Grant shot him dead, where he lay in a fetal position. Before leaving the residence, Grant attempted to stage the crime as a murder-suicide, placing the gun by his brother's body.

The next day, when Cody failed to come in for work, his coworkers became concerned and called the police requesting a wellness check. Police arrived at the murder scene at 9:17 a.m., wherein they raided the house after no response was found after finding out all the entrances were locked. Once a deputy went in, Chad was found on his back on the kitchen floor, Cody curled on the floor in a storage room, and Margaret sprawled over the desk in their home office.  Amato was tracked down at a DoubleTree Hotel at approximately 7:45 a.m. on January 26 in Orange County, Florida, after his 1996 Honda Accord was identified.

Grant was subsequently taken in for questioning. At the end of the interrogation, his brother Jason tried to talk to him, asking him to confess to what had happened, but Grant was unwavering in his claims to innocence. When being interrogated, he had differing stories, one of which said he'd seen police and news vans outside his house following the murders, but instead of going home he went to a local Panera Bread and searched up "top news stories." He was subsequently arrested on charges of first-degree murder. However, he was granted a $750,000 bond on April 25, 2019, after his public defender stated the court did not follow proper procedure for his case, and he was allowed to prepare for his case on the condition he could not have access to electronics.

Trial
Amato's trial began on July 15, 2019. Before people testified, crime scene analysts on behalf of the prosecution attempted to show things that were out of place, but Amato's attorney questioned when they realized he was the main suspect and if that could have affected the examination. On August 9, individuals were asked to testify as part of the penalty phase, with three people testifying on each side's behalf. Grant's brother Jason testified against him. The state of Florida told the sitting judge that they intended to seek the death penalty, but the 12 jurors did not unanimously agree on giving Amato the death penalty. This translated to an automatic sentence of life in prison without the possibility of parole. On August 12, Amato was found guilty of all three counts of first-degree murder, receiving a life sentence for each. When asked if he felt remorse, Amato responded with, "My family has been blaming me for months for ruining their lives, stealing, and not following the rules of the home, so I might as well be blamed for this too."

References

American murderers
1989 births
Living people